1 Street SW station is a stop in downtown Calgary on the city's CTrain light rail system. The 1 Street platform is served by westbound trains only, with the nearest eastbound train platforms being Centre Street station and 3 Street SW station, both of which only serve eastbound trains. The platform is located on the north side of 7 Avenue South, west of Centre Street within the free fare zone, serving both routes 201 and 202.

The original 1 Street W station opened on May 25, 1981, as part of Calgary's first LRT line from 8 Street W to Anderson and was located between 1 Street & 2 Street SW (across from the Scotia Center). On October 28, 2005, a new four-car platform for the 1 Street Southwest stop was finished. The platform moved to a new location between 1 Street and Centre Street, one block east of its old location. This was the first station to be refurbished as part of the 7 Avenue Refurbishment Project.

All of the 7 Avenue Refurbished Stations that followed in 2005 - 2012 use the same basic design as Centre Street where the entire sidewalk slopes up to platform level. However, the canopy design at Centre Street is slightly different from the newer stations constructed in 2005 and onwards.

The Telus Convention Centre, Glenbow Museum, and the Calgary Tower are located near these platforms, as are skyscrapers such as the Suncor Energy Centre, Scotia Centre and Bow Valley Square.

In 2005 the station registered an average of 19,000 weekday boardings.

References

CTrain stations
Railway stations in Canada opened in 1981
1981 establishments in Alberta